Shankar Ghosh is an Indian politician from Bharatiya Janata Party. He was elected as a member of the West Bengal Legislative Assembly from Siliguri (constituency), in 2021 West Bengal Legislative Assembly election. 

It is his passion to work for the development of society. He has been actively involved in activities related to human well-being and standing for the cause of the common man since his student days. He believes in ground-level action. Having worked actively in Siliguri for several decades, Dr. Ghosh is well aware of the issues prevailing in the city and in North Bengal at large. He envisions a smart, environment friendly and humane Siliguri and is working actively for the cause of the same.

Early life and education 
Shankar Ghosh was born at Bishnupur in Bankura District, West Bengal,  India. His early life was spent at several places including Medinipur, Jhargram, Joypur, Jorbangla. 

He completed his college and got doctoral studies from University of North Bengal.

From his early student days he was involved in social work and helping the poor.  Sankar has always been in limelight for the cause of the common man due to his association with CPIM.

Political career 
Shankar Ghosh joined SFI in 1991 and DYFI in 1995. He played an active role in all these organisations. 
He was part of the Indian Delegation Team at the 17th World Festival of Youth and Students, held in South Africa in 2010.
In 2015 he was elected as the Councillor from ward 24 in Siliguri.

His active role in politics is exemplified by the fact that even though he was a first-time Councillor, he was appointed the Member Mayor in Council (Education, Sports, Culture and Youth). Later he was also given additional charge of Health. During his tenure, he undertook several activities and initiatives for the development of Siliguri and the well-being of the people. He was actively involved in addressing the first wave of the COVID-19 pandemic in Siliguri, during his term as a member of the Board of Administrators in Siliguri.

He joined the Bharatiya Janta Party on 12 March 2021. On 2 May 2021, he was elected as the Member of Legislative Assembly from the Siliguri Assembly constituency by defeating Om Prakash Mishra of All India Trinamool Congress by 35,586 votes.

References 

Living people
21st-century Indian politicians
People from Darjeeling district
Bharatiya Janata Party politicians from West Bengal
West Bengal MLAs 2021–2026
1974 births